Arnaud Clément (born 17 December 1977) is a French former professional tennis player and Davis Cup captain. Clément reached the final of the 2001 Australian Open and achieved a career-high ranking of world No. 10 in April of that year. Partnering Michaël Llodra in men's doubles, he won Wimbledon in 2007 and two Masters titles.

Life and career
Clément was born in Aix-en-Provence to Henri Clément and Maria Michel. He began to play tennis at the age of seven with his older brother Bruno, who later became his coach. His grandmother is Lebanese. He currently lives in Geneva, Switzerland.

He turned professional in 1996, and achieved his career highlight at the 2001 Australian Open, reaching the men's singles final, where he was defeated by Andre Agassi. En route, Clement defeated the then-unseeded future world No. 1, Roger Federer, and the former world No. 1, Yevgeny Kafelnikov.

While playing, he often wore a bandana and sunglasses. The sunglasses have been medically prescribed for Clement because of severe eye problems he has encountered through his life, which had nearly left him blind as a child. At only 13 months old, he was diagnosed with unilateral coloboma, meaning the condition only affects one eye, at that time Clément was only given a 40/60% chance of having healthy eyesight for the rest of his life, throughout his tennis career Clément has worn sunglasses to protect his eyes.

Clément was selected to represent one of the world's best-known and most important fashion labels, Lacoste. He was seen from May 2004 onwards in a pan-European print and TV campaign alongside the Danish pop singer Natasha Thomas. The advert was directed and shot by Bruno Aveillan.

Clément has been ranked as high as world No. 10 in singles and as high as world No. 8 in doubles, where he has often partnered with fellow Frenchmen Sébastien Grosjean and Michaël Llodra. He has won four ATP singles titles (Lyon 2000, Metz 2003, Marseille 2006, Washington 2006), and twelve doubles titles including Wimbledon.

Throughout his career, he has beaten top players such as Andre Agassi, Pat Rafter, Carlos Moyá and more recently Roger Federer, Rafael Nadal and Novak Djokovic.

Until 2010, Clément held the record for the longest match in the history of the Open Era. At Roland Garros 2004, Fabrice Santoro defeated Clément 6–4, 6–3, 6–7, 3–6, 16–14 in six hours and 33 minutes. John Isner and Nicolas Mahut would eventually beat this record six years later at Wimbledon.

In March 2006, Clément ended his two and a half-year period of not winning an ATP singles title by capturing the Marseille Open, defeating world No. 2, Rafael Nadal, in the semifinals and Mario Ančić in the finals. In August 2006, Clément won his first ATP title in the United States, defeating Murray in straight sets in the final of the Legg Mason Tennis Classic.

In July 2007, Arnaud Clément and Michaël Llodra won the men's double title at Wimbledon, beating world No. 1 and top seeds defending champions, Bob and Mike Bryan, thus winning his first Grand Slam doubles title (Llodra had won two previous titles with Fabrice Santoro, making it his third Grand Slam title). He and Llodra were ecstatic, and celebrated by throwing their shirts, rackets, and towels into the crowd.

In July 2008, Arnaud Clément and Rainer Schüttler, both in their early 30s, played against each other in a Wimbledon quarterfinal singles match. Because of rain delays and darkness, play was suspended over a period of two days. Eventually, the match went in favour of Schüttler. The match went five sets and over five hours combined within the two playing days. The fifth set's score was 8–6. Finishing in five hours and twelve minutes, it was the third-longest men's singles match in Wimbledon history.

In June 2012, Arnaud Clément formalized his retirement from professional tennis at the age of 34, after a 16-year career.
He's the French Davis Cup captain since 2013.

Clément has been in a relationship with French pop singer Nolwenn Leroy since 2008.

Significant finals

Grand Slam tournament finals

Singles: 1 (1 runner-up)

Doubles: 2 (1 title, 1 runner-up)

Masters 1000 finals

Doubles: 2 (2 titles)

ATP career finals

Singles: 11 (4 titles, 7 runner-ups)

Doubles: 22 (12 titles, 10 runner-ups)

Performance timelines

Singles

Doubles

Top 10 wins

References

External links

 
 
 
 
 
 

1977 births
Living people
French expatriate sportspeople in Switzerland
French male tennis players
Hopman Cup competitors
Olympic tennis players of France
Sportspeople from Aix-en-Provence
Tennis players from Geneva
French people of Lebanese descent
Sportspeople of Lebanese descent
Tennis players at the 2000 Summer Olympics
Tennis players at the 2004 Summer Olympics
Tennis players at the 2008 Summer Olympics
Wimbledon champions
Grand Slam (tennis) champions in men's doubles